A Gilded Fool is a four-act comedy play written by Henry Guy Carleton at the request of actor Nat Goodwin. After debuting in Providence, Rhode Island at the beginning of September 1892, the production quickly relocated to New York City, where it appeared first in Brooklyn, then on Broadway.

History
Actor Nat Goodwin, who had become known for comedy, wanted to appear in a humorous play that included some elements of drama. He asked playwright Henry Guy Carleton, who had recently written two tragedies, to work with him on the story that became A Gilded Fool. The play debuted at the Providence Opera House on September 1, 1892, then moved to the Park Theatre in Brooklyn, New York, on September 5, 1892. It was staged on Broadway at the Fifth Avenue Theatre, where it opened on November 7, 1892.

Plot
Chauncey Short, a friendly but unworldly young man, inherits a large fortune. He is romantically interested in Margaret Ruthven. The business run by Margaret's father, Matthew, is failing due to the manipulations of Bannister Strange. Strange tries to prevent Chauncey from helping the Ruthven firm by convincing him that Margaret is no longer interested in him. Suspicious, Chauncey asks for help from detective Jacob Howell, who disguises himself as a preacher to investigate Strange. Upon learning that Strange is lying, Chauncey decides to do the opposite of everything Strange recommends. By defying Strange's misleading advice, Chuancey builds an even bigger fortune and is able to save the Ruthvens from bankruptcy.

Cast and characters
The characters and cast from the Broadway production are given below:

Film adaptation
In 1915, the play was adapted as a silent film of the same name, directed by Edgar Lewis. Fox Film produced the adaptation, which starred William Farnum as Chauncey.

References

1892 plays
Broadway plays
Comedy plays
English-language plays
American plays adapted into films
Plays by Henry Guy Carleton